Lamme Goedzak is a character in Charles De Coster's novel The Legend of Thyl Ulenspiegel and Lamme Goedzak (1867). He is the best friend of Thyl Ulenspiegel. While Ulenspiegel himself is derived from Dutch-German-Flemish folklore Lamme Goedzak is entirely created by De Coster. Despite this he has become one of the most recognizable Flemish folklore characters since.

Camille Huysmans, in his commentary on De Coster, considered Lamme Goedzak to be modeled on Sancho Panza, Don Quixote's loyal companion in the novel by Miguel de Cervantes.

Character

Lamme Goedzak's name literally translates as "lazy  kind soul", which already hints at his personality. Lamme is a jolly, good-natured, if somewhat naïve man. He functions as a sidekick to Ulenspiegel, with whom he shares his knack for fooling other people, especially clergymen and the Spanish invaders. While sometimes slow-witted Lamme is nevertheless Tijl's most loyal friend.

Lamme is also known for being a Bruegelian bon vivant who enjoys eating and drinking . When depicted on book illustrations he is usually carrying food and wine.

In the novel some information about Lamme's background history is provided. As a child he ran away from home because his younger sister taunted him and he wasn't assertive enough to do something about it. He is married, but lost track of his wife and desperately tries to find her back, while resisting the temptation of other women. Eventually, it turns out that the wife - a staunch Catholic while Goedzak himself is a Protestant - has been misled by an unscrupulous monk into taking a vow of abstinence.

While searching for her, Goedzak along with Ulenspiegel is drawn into the Dutch Revolt against Spanish rule, and despite his fatness and indolence manages to prove his mettle in various perilous situations. Finally he finds an ideal slot as a ship's cook on one of the vessels of the Sea Beggars , the famed rebel/pirate fleet harassing the Spanish; it is commonly agreed that he could take as many extra helpings as he wants from his own excellent dishes. Eventually, after a long and hard search Goedzak finds back his wife, proves to her the hypocrisy of the monk, and they are happily reunited.

Cultural status

The expression "lamme goedzak" has become an eponym in the Dutch language, referring to a "good, loveable, but naïve person, prone to being taken advantage of." The term is also used for obese, jolly people who enjoying eating and drinking. Certain Flemish comics characters, like Lambik and Nero, have also been compared with Lamme Goedzak in terms of character.

A boat trip from Bruges to Damme has been named after him, a theater company in Bruges, a local history organization in Ruddervoorde and a beer brand. Various restaurants and cafés in Lebbeek, Breda, Belsele, Zoersel, Noordwijk, and Bonn.

Jean Carmet played Lamme in the 1956 film adaptation of the story, Les Aventures de Till L'Espiègle.

In the Flemish TV series "Tijl Uilenspiegel" (1961) Anton Peters played the part of Lamme.

Ray Goossens had a 1945 comic strip based on Tijl Uilenspiegel, where Tijl and Lamme Goedzak were portrayed as a comedic duo. The series was sometimes called Tijl en Lamme too.

Willy Vandersteen used Lamme Goedzak in his 1952-1954 comic book adaptation of "Tijl Uilenspiegel". In Vandersteen's final comics series, De Geuzen (1985-1990), which is set in the 16th century, the central character is a young intelligent man named Hannes. His sidekick is an obese man who enjoys eating and drinking and who is clearly an expy of Lamme Goedzak, down to his name "Tamme".

Sources

Literary characters introduced in 1867
Sidekicks in literature
Fictional characters from Flanders
Fictional unemployed people
Fictional tricksters
Fictional con artists
Belgian folklore
Till Eulenspiegel
Male characters in literature
Comedy literature characters